The seventh season of The Voice Kids of Vietnam – Giọng hát Việt nhí began on 20 July 2019 on VTV3. All three duo coaches and the main host did not return, leaving the panel to be entirely renewed this season. On 12 June 2019, it was announced that former host and The Voice season 4 Ali Hoàng Dương would return, this time as a coach alongside former music executive Lưu Thiên Hương as a new duo coach; whereas former coach Dương Khắc Linh would return with singer Phạm Quỳnh Anh. Musician Dương Cầm and 2018 Miss International Queen Hương Giang joined the show as a new duo coach, while actresses Gil Lê and Khả Ngân also debuted as hosts. The previous season's coach, Hồ Hoài Anh, once again became the show's music executive.

Teams
Color key

Blind auditions
Filming for the blind auditions began on 12 June 12 2019. The team sizes were trimmed down to 12 per team. Each coach has the length of the contestant's performance to choose them for their team. If more than two coaches want the same contestant, the contestant will choose which team they want to join. The blind auditions end when all teams are full. 

The "Block" twist returned for the second time, this season the number of available block is raised to two for each coach in entire blind audition and when the blocked coach press his or her button to turn, the chair does not turn around. In a new twist, contestants can "protect" the blocked coach and still pick that team, but the blocked coach would fall into The Frozen state in the next performance and would not be able to press the button in that performance. Each coach has only one "Breaking The Block" per audition.

Color key

Episode 1 (20 July)

Episode 2 (27 July)

Episode 3 (03 August)

Episode 4 (10 August)

The Battles
The Battle Round was taped on 19 July 19 2019, following the same matching rules as applied in previous seasons. Season seven's advisors include: musician Bảo Lan for team Dương Cầm & Hương Giang, former coach of the adult version Tóc Tiên for team Ali Hoàng Dương & Lưu Thiên Hương, and last season's coach Soobin Hoàng Sơn for team Dương Khắc Linh & Phạm Quỳnh Anh. This season, the coaches can "steal" two losing artists from another team as well as save one losing artist from their own team. Contestants who won their battles or were saved by the coaches would advance to the Knockouts. 

Color key:

The Knockouts/the Cross Battles
The new Knockout round took place on 7 September and lasted until the following week. For the first time in the history of The Voice Kids, the cross-battle was applied which featured battles between contestants from different teams. This round's rules was adopted from the fifth season of the adult version. Each turn, three duo coaches would send one of their team member to a cross battle, and only one contestant with the highest point accumulated from the audience's vote as well as vote from a ten-person professional jury would advance to the next round. Each member of the panel can only vote for one contestant from the trio. 

At the end of the round, each coaches could save one of their losing artists, whereas one eliminated artist who had the highest points would also receive the jury's vote and advance to the next round. This new rule resulted in an uneven number of contestants between teams going into the Playoffs.

Color key:

The Playoffs
Color key:

Round 1: Minishow (21 September, 28 September and 5 October)
This year, after the conclusion of a team, each coach had to eliminate one contestant from their teams. At the end of the round, a contestant who receive the lowest vote from the audience would also be eliminated, leaving nine artists advancing to the next round.

Round 2: Quarterfinal (Top 9)
The remaining nine artists each performed a solo performance for a spot in the Semi-final. At the end of the night, each team had to eliminate one contestant, leaving six artists advanced to next week's Semi-final. A Wildcard vote was conducted to save two contestants who was eliminated from this stage of the competition to the Live Finale.

Round 3: Semifinal (Top 6)
The remaining six artists performed a solo performance for a spot in the Grand Final. At the end of the night, one contestant from each team would advance to the finals based on coaches' choices. The result of the Wildcard was announced on 21 October, revealing the last two finalists. The recipients of the Wildcards were Nguyễn Đỗ Khánh An and Nguyễn Ngọc Bảo Hân.

Elimination chart
Artist's info
  Artist from Team Dương Cầm & Hương Giang
  Artist from Team Ali Hoàng Dương & Lưu Thiên Hương
  Artist from Team Dương Khắc Linh & Phạm Quỳnh Anh
Result details

Controversies
Throughout the airing time of the season, there were many accusations that the show's result was fixed in favor of one team over the other two. During the Cross Battles, controversy arose when a contestant received the highest vote count from the professional jury, creating a big difference with the other two contestants but was then eliminated because of the audience's vote. After the show aired, many viewers expressed their frustration, saying that the producers deliberately arranged the results in order to send through a contestant from Lưu Thiên Hương's team because she has a close relationship with the producers and the music director. The public also criticised the justice of the "audience vote", questioning whether audiences in the studio actually voted. However, producers of The Voice Kids did not give a response.

During the Live Finale which aired on 26 October 2019, upon announcing the final results, host Nguyên Khang mistakenly named the first runner-up, Nguyễn Đoàn Chấn Quốc (team Dương Cầm & Hương Giang) as the winner. A few moments later, Nguyên Khang announced that he had read the results incorrectly and that Kiều Minh Tâm (team Ali Hoàng Dương & Lưu Thiên Hương) was the actual winner. Accusations once again arose that the final result was fixed in favor of Lưu Thiên Hương's contestant, whereas the majority of viewers criticised the show for making a joke of children's feelings. Nguyên Khang however did publicly apologize to Chấn Quốc and his family about his mistake.

On 27 October, a day after the finale, when asked about the incident during the crown moment, Lưu Thiên Hương commented that she thought it was a "small accident" and considered it "memorable" for helping build up bravery for contestants. Her comment immediately received mixed reactions from artists alike as well as the public, with singer Dương Triệu Vũ, supermodel Xuân Lan and Lê Thúy all expressing their frustrations via social media.

Contestants who appeared on previous shows or seasons
 Lương Trương Quỳnh Anh appeared on the show's last season but did not turn a chair.
 Trần Thị Vân Anh auditioned for the show's fifth season but failed to make a team.
 Nguyễn Đỗ Khánh An was the winner of Bolero Idol Kids in 2018.

References

2010s Vietnamese television series
1